The men's Greco-Roman middleweight was a Greco-Roman wrestling event held as part of the Wrestling at the 1924 Summer Olympics programme. It was the fourth appearance of the event. Middleweight was the third-heaviest category, including wrestlers weighing 67 to 75 kilograms.

Results
Source: Official results; Wudarski

The tournament was double-elimination.

First round

Second round

Third round

Fourth round

Fifth round

Sixth round

After this round, the undefeated Lindfors and Westerlund and the one-loss Steinberg were left.  Lindfors and Westerlund advanced to the seventh round to face each other for gold, while Steinberg received the bronze.

Seventh round

References

Wrestling at the 1924 Summer Olympics
Greco-Roman wrestling